Mary Fox-Strangways, Countess of Ilchester (born Mary Eleanor Anne Dawson; 1852–1935) was an Anglo-Irish noblewoman, an anti-suffragist and a leading figure in London society. She was the wife of Henry Fox-Strangways, 5th Earl of Ilchester.

Life 

Mary Eleanor Anne Dawson was born in 1852, the fourth child and only daughter of Richard Dawson, 1st Earl of Dartrey and Augusta Stanley. She married Henry Fox-Strangways, 5th Earl of Ilchester on 8 February 1872 and became the Countess of Ilchester. The couple had two children: Giles Fox-Strangways, 6th Earl of Ilchester and Muriel Augusta (Fox-Strangways) Digby. The family lived at Holland House after the Countess' husband took over the property in 1899. The Ilchesters also owned the Abbotsbury Gardens. The Countess published a catalogue of the garden's 4000 plants in 1899. In 1902, she edited and published a collection of the letters of Lady Sarah Lennox.

The Countess was active in the anti-suffrage cause. She founded the London branch of the Women's National Anti-Suffrage League in South Kensington in 1908. Together with the Duchess of Montrose and others, she published an article in the Pall Mall Magazine titled "Why Women Should Not Have the Vote, From the Woman’s Point of View." A member of the Primrose League, she advocated for Conservative politics. She also served as president of the Women's Unionist and Tariff Reform Association.

References

External links 
 1873 portrait of Mary Ilchester - Royal Household Portraits
 Watercolor painted by Mary, Countess of Ilchester - In the Royal Collection Trust

1852 births
1935 deaths
Anti-suffragists
Ilchester
Daughters of British earls
Mary
Mary
British painters